Dördlər or Dörtlər or Dortlyar may refer to:

 Dördlər, Fuzuli, Azerbaijan
 Dördlər, Gadabay, Azerbaijan
 Dördlər, Neftchala (disambiguation), Azerbaijan
 Dörtler, Erzincan, Turkey